Perfect Stranger is the tenth studio album by American country music artist T. G. Sheppard. It was released in 1982 via Warner Bros. and Curb Records.  The album includes the singles "War Is Hell (On the Homefront Too)" and "Faking Love".

Track listing

Chart performance

References

1982 albums
T. G. Sheppard albums
Warner Records albums
Curb Records albums